Copa Río Branco (also: Taça Rio Branco) was a national football team's competition set between 1931 and 1976 among the national football teams of Brazil and Uruguay. Brazil won the most competitions with 7 titles.

History 
The Copa Río Branco was first contested 1931 in Estádio das Laranjeiras (a historic football stadium of Rio de Janeiro). All other subsequent games have been played in Uruguayan Stadium Estádio Centenario of Montevideo and in Brazilian Stadiums Estádio do Pacaembu of São Paulo and Estádio São Januário of Rio de Janeiro.

Brazil won the cup 7 times and Uruguay won 4 times. Due to a tie in 1967 both nations were declared winners.

Results 
List of matches, detailed. Since the 1940 edition, the competition was played in a two-legged format.

Notes

References

Brazil national football team matches
Uruguay national football team matches
International association football competitions hosted by Uruguay
International association football competitions hosted by Brazil
Defunct international association football competitions in South America
Recurring sporting events established in 1931
Recurring events disestablished in 1976
Brazil–Uruguay football rivalry